Alderton may refer to:

Places

England
Alderton, Gloucestershire
Alderton, Northamptonshire
Alderton, Shropshire
Alderton, Suffolk
Alderton, Wiltshire
Alderton Tunnel, railway tunnel

United States
Alderton, Washington

People
Alderton (surname)